The following are the national records in athletics in Algeria maintained by its national athletics federation: Fédération Algérienne d'Athlétisme (FAA).

Outdoor

Key to tables:

h = hand timing

+ = en route to a longer distance

NWI = no wind information

Men

Women

Indoor

Men

Women

Notes

References
General
World Athletics Statistic Handbook 2019: National Outdoor Records
World Athletics Statistic Handbook 2022: National Indoor Records
Specific

External links
 FAA web site

Algeria
Records in athletics
Athletics in Algeria
Athletics